1961 college football season may refer to:

 1961 NCAA University Division football season
 1961 NCAA College Division football season
 1961 NAIA football season